The Mississippi Center for Public Policy (MCPP) is a free-market, conservative think tank located in Jackson, Mississippi. The organization's stated mission is "To advance the constitutional ideals of liberty and justice for all Mississippians by employing an evidenced-based approach to public policy whereby we advocate for and advance real conservative ideas with policy makers, members of the media, business leaders, the academic community, and private citizens."

MCPP generally advocates for lower taxes, fewer government regulations, religious liberty, educational freedom, and free-market healthcare reforms.

In January 2021, Douglas Carswell was appointed as the President & CEO.

Publications 
In 2019, Mississippi Center for Public Policy released their policy guide book, The High Road to Freedom. This includes more than 100 policy recommendations that MCPP supports among 25 issues, including: Regulations, Law, Local Governance, Economy, Budget, Taxes, Healthcare, and Education.

In the early 2000s, MCPP released Governing By Principle. This includes 10 foundational principles that the organization believes all policy should follow.

Mississippi Justice Institute
The institute has a legal arm called the Mississippi Justice Institute.

In 2018, Aaron Rice became Director of the Mississippi Justice Institute. Rice was named a recipient of the MS Top 50 in 2020. Former Directors include Shad White, who went on to become State Auditor of Mississippi, and D. Michael Hurst Jr., who became United States Attorney for the United States District Court for the Southern District of Mississippi.

In 2016, when the Southern Poverty Law Center filed a lawsuit challenging the constitutionality of Mississippi's public charter schools, the Mississippi Justice Institute intervened on behalf of parents whose children attend these charter schools. In 2019, the Supreme Court of Mississippi ruled in favor of charter school students and MJI, allowing charter schools to continue to receive taxpayer funding.

The Mississippi Justice Institute has filed multiple economic liberty lawsuits challenging various occupational licensing laws. In 2019, Mississippi Justice Institute sued the Mississippi Department of Cosmetology on behalf of Dipa Bhattarai, an eyebrow threader whose business was closed because she did not have the required occupational license. In 2020, MJI sued the Mississippi Department of Health on behalf of Donna Harris who was providing weight loss advice for clients. The state argued that she could not do that because she wasn't a registered dietician. This lawsuit was profiled in The Wall Street Journal.

In the spring of 2020, the Mississippi Justice Institute filed two lawsuits against two mayors concerning COVID-19 pandemic related restrictions. Mississippi Justice Institute sued the city of Jackson, Mississippi after Mayor Chokwe Antar Lumumba issued an executive order restricting the right to openly carry a firearm because of the pandemic. A consent decree prohibits the city from attempting to restrict open carry again. MJI also sued the city of Greenville, Mississippi over an order prohibiting drive-in church services in the city.

References

External links
 

Non-profit organizations based in Mississippi
Political and economic think tanks in the United States
Conservative organizations in the United States